Amblygaster clupeoides, the bleeker smoothbelly sardinella, blue pilchard, sharp-nosed pilchard, or sharpnose sardine, is a reef-associated marine species of sardinellas in the herring family Clupeidae. It is one of the three species of genus Amblygaster.

Distribution 
It is found in the marine waters along Indo-West Pacific regions.

Description 
The fish has 13 to 21 dorsal soft rays and 12 to 23 anal soft rays. It grows up to a maximum length of 21 cm. The flank is gold in fresh fish but becomes black while preservation. Belly is more rounded and scutes are not prominent.

Diet 
The fish feeds on minute organisms like copepods, Mysis and zooplankton. Widely used as bait in the tuna fishery all along the world, both as a live or dead forms.

See also
 Amblygaster leiogaster 
 Amblygaster sirm
 Commercial fish of Sri Lanka

References

External links
 

Clupeidae
Taxa named by Pieter Bleeker
Fish described in 1849
Fish of the Indian Ocean
Fish of the Pacific Ocean